Duane A. Wills (March 10, 1939 – May 21, 2007) was a lieutenant general in the United States Marine Corps who served as Deputy Commandant for Aviation for the Marine Corps from 1990 to 1993. A graduate of the University of California, Los Angeles, he was commissioned in 1961 and retired in 1993. He retired in 1993 and died in Tucson, Arizona in 2007.

References

1939 births
2007 deaths
United States Marine Corps generals